Teresa “Tere” Morató Armengol (born 28 March 1998) is an Andorran professional footballer who plays as a forward for Spanish Liga F club Villarreal CF and the Andorra women's national team.

Club career
Morató began her club career at ENFAF Crèdit Andorrà, the only Andorran women's club, which competes in Spain. In the 2015–16 season, she scored 61 goals in 24 matches, being by far the top scorer of the Catalan Women's First Division (Spanish fourth level). Despite her outstanding personal performance, the team finished 12th in the standings.

Morató's impressive performances with ENFAF meant that FC Barcelona signed her for its reserve team in the summer of 2016.

In July 2020, Morató signed for Rayo Vallecano and became the first Andorran player to join the Spanish women's first division.

International goals

See also
List of Andorra women's international footballers

References

External links 
 
 Teresa at Txapeldunak.com 

1998 births
Living people
People from Andorra la Vella
Andorran women's footballers
Women's association football midfielders
Women's association football forwards
Andorra women's international footballers
Andorran people of Catalan descent
Citizens of Spain through descent
Footballers from Catalonia
Spanish women's footballers
Rayo Vallecano Femenino players
Villarreal CF (women) players
Segunda Federación (women) players
Primera División (women) players
Spanish people of Andorran descent